Amel Eliza Larrieux (née Stowell; born March 8, 1973) is an American singer-songwriter and keyboardist. Larrieux rose to fame in the mid-1990s as a founding member of the duo Groove Theory along with Bryce Wilson. After leaving the group in 1999, she released her debut solo album, Infinite Possibilities, the following year on Epic Records.

In late 2003, Larrieux and her husband, producer Laru Larrieux, founded the independent label Blisslife Records, on which she has released four albums so far. Larrieux cites Ella Fitzgerald, Prince, Sade, Rickie Lee Jones, Stevie Wonder, Shawn Colvin, Chaka Khan, John Lennon, Patrice Rushen, Jimi Hendrix, and Joni Mitchell as her musical influences. The Japanese star vocalist Hikaru Utada cites Larrieux as her musical influence.

Life and career

Early life
Larrieux was born Amel Eliza Stowell on March 8, 1973, in New York City.
Amel's mother is African American and her father is European descendant.

Groove Theory
In 1991, Larrieux met Mantronix member Bryce Wilson at Rondor Music. Wilson, who wanted to begin his solo career as producer and musician, was looking for a vocalist to work with. Wilson and Larrieux began to produce demos together and subsequently formed the duo Groove Theory. Their debut release, Groove Theory, spawned several radio hits such as "Tell Me", "Keep Tryin'", and "Baby Luv". The duo were also featured in successful motion picture soundtracks such as 1996's Sunset Park and 1997's Love Jones. Larrieux, pursuing a solo career, would not be involved in the duo's eventually-shelved second album The Answer. Makeda Davis would step in as lead singer in 1999 until Groove Theory officially disbanded in 2001. Larrieux said of leaving the group, "You have to make a bunch of compromises and .. you know, I just couldn't go on forever. We wanted different things and a combination of that and the label wanting different things from us just made me decide that it was time to move on."

Solo career
In 1996, Larrieux guested on the self-titled debut album of Sade's backing band Sweetback, yielding the single "You Will Rise", which reached number 42 on the Hot R&B/Hip-Hop Songs chart.

Larrieux co-wrote and co-produced her debut solo album Infinite Possibilities, released in February 2000 on Epic Records, along with husband Laru Larrieux; the album reached number 79 on the Billboard 200 and number 21 on the Top R&B/Hip-Hop Albums, and produced the hit "Get Up", written and produced by Nelly Furtado, her highest-charting solo hit to date.

Larrieux parted ways with Epic Records after this CD. "I was asked to tone it down as a solo artist, which is one of the reasons why I was really glad to leave the major label where I was signed", she said. Husband Laru Larrieux, who had been co-writing and producing most of Amel's material, started the independent label Blisslife Records with her to distribute her music.

In 2001, Larrieux covered "Sophisticated Lady" with artist Clark Terry for the Red Hot Organization's compilation album Red Hot + Indigo, a tribute to Duke Ellington, which raised money for various charities devoted to increasing AIDS awareness and fighting the disease.

On November 10, 2010, Larrieux spoke about going independent, saying, "This is the right time [to be independent]. People are more hip to the internet. People are more open to what independent means." She went on to say that black independent artists are too under the radar.

Her second album Bravebird was released under Larrieux's independent label Blisslife Records label on January 20, 2004. While it underperformed on the Billboard 200, it peaked at number 28 on the Top R&B/Hip-Hop Albums and number five on Independent Albums.  It spawned the midtempo radio single "For Real", which showcases her ability to utilize the whistle register and inspired Ebony magazine to rave about her "ethereal high-octave vocals that bring to mind Minnie Riperton.  A portion of the album's seventh track, "Giving Something Up", could be heard in the commercial for BET's HIV/AIDS awareness campaign Rap-It-Up, in which Larrieux participated in September 2003.

Larrieux's collaboration with Stanley Clarke and Glenn Lewis, a cover of Roberta Flack and Donny Hathaway's 1972 song "Where Is the Love" from Clarke's 2003 album 1, 2, To the Bass, received a nomination for Best R&B Performance by a Duo or Group with Vocals at the 2004 Grammy Awards.

Larrieux's third album Morning was released in April 2006 and features the single "Weary", which reached number 29 on the Billboard Hot Adult R&B Airplay chart in May 2006. Morning is her highest-charting album to date, peaking at number 74. The song "No One Else", written for Mike Shaunessy, was featured on the soundtrack to Tyler Perry's 2007 film Why Did I Get Married?.

In May 2007, Larrieux released an album of jazz standard covers titled Lovely Standards. It broke into the top five of the Top Jazz Albums and sold 3,700 units in its first week of release.

Larrieux was featured on 2Pac's 2007 greatest hits album Best of 2Pac Part 1: Thug, on the previously unreleased song "Resist the Temptation".

On February 4, 2010, SoulSummer.com announced that Larrieux is currently in the studio with Bryce Wilson working on Groove Theory's second official album. The duo had their first live show together in years on October 7, 2010, in Tokyo, Japan. Larrieux said of the show, "Tokyo was too fly, as usual. The audiences just got better and better." Larrieux said in a November 2010 interview that she and Wilson are currently looking for a label they feel comfortable with. As of August 2011 Larrieux stated Groove Theory have not recorded any new material.

In March 2009, Larrieux released the songs "Orange Glow" and "Don't Let Me Down" from her fifth studio album, Ice Cream Every Day, to iTunes and other online music stores.  Larrieux also contributed "Don't Let Me Down" to the Enough Project. Proceeds from the compilation fund efforts to make the protection and empowerment of Congo's women a priority, as well as inspire individuals around the world to raise their voice for peace in Congo. Larrieux said on Oct 19, 2010 that she was "dutifully" trying new things for her fifth studio album. In August 2011, Larrieux confirmed through Power Player Magazine the release date for her new album to be late January 2012. When asked about the five-year delay on her fifth album, Larrieux said she wanted to add and delete more songs to perfect the final product. "I stay on the road a lot", she said. "My experiences inform me as a writer, so then I come back and I have more songs to write, and I keep adding and subtracting, so the editing process made this album take a little bit longer than I expected."

Larrieux's song "Don't Let Me Down" was used in the 2014 film Beyond the Lights.

Discography

Studio albums

Singles

Promotional singles

Guest appearances

Music videos

Notes

References

External links
 
 
 

1973 births
550 Music artists
African-American women singer-songwriters
African-American record producers
American contemporary R&B singers
Record producers from New York (state)
American sopranos
American soul keyboardists
Epic Records artists
Living people
American neo soul singers
People from Greenwich Village
Singers from New York City
Ballad musicians
American women record producers
Philadelphia High School for the Creative and Performing Arts alumni
20th-century African-American women singers
21st-century African-American women singers
Singer-songwriters from New York (state)